The Rakuten Monkeys, formerly First Financial Holdings Agan (abbreviated ), La New Bears and then the Lamigo Monkeys, are a professional baseball team in the Chinese Professional Baseball League (CPBL) in Taiwan. Owned and administered by the Kaohsiung-based shoe-producing La New Corporation and then the Japan-based electronic commerce and online retailing company Rakuten, the Monkeys qualified for the playoffs in 2006 for the first time in team history, and by finishing with the best record for the whole season, gained an automatic berth in the Taiwan Series.

The team played their home games at Chengcing Lake Baseball Field in Kaohsiung County (now part of Kaohsiung City) from 2004 to 2010. In the 2011 season, their home stadium was moved to Taoyuan International Baseball Stadium. Accordingly, the team's name was changed to the Lamigo Monkeys, and the current owner Rakuten maintains the "Monkeys" name.

History

First Financial Holdings Agan (2003)

First known as the First Securities Agan, the team was owned by the First Financial Holding Corporation, a government-funded financial holding service institute. Its then-chairman Chen Chien-lung was a keen political supporter of President Chen Shui-bian, and, upon the president's request, immediately agreed to take over one of the two former TML teams after TML was merged into CPBL in January 2003. Since Macoto Bank had already decided to take-over the Macoto Gida, Chen Chien-lung took over the Agan as promised. The majority of Agan's player came from Taipei Gida and Kaohsiung-Pingtung Fala, and not from the Taichung Agan, which carried the same mascot and were the champions of the final season of TML. Agan played its home games at Chengcing Lake Baseball Field.

After Chen Chien-lung's sudden resignation due to allegation of insider trading in August 2003, the First Financial Holding Corporation no longer showed willingness in running the team. The Agan finished the 2003 season placing fifth overall, and did not win any of the 20 games against Brother Elephants, the Taiwan Series champions of that season.

La New Bears (2004–2010)
Just before the 2004 season, Kaohsiung County Magistrate Yang Chiu-hsing invited the La New Corporation, a footwear manufacturer to sponsor the then-vacant Chengcing Lake Baseball Field, which was under the management of Kaohsiung County after the disbandment of Taiwan Major League. La New Corporation eventually agreed and, in addition, offered to buy the First Financial Holdings Agan, whose management had been struggling in the past season. On December 16, 2003, La New completed the process with First Financial Holdings and renamed the team La New Bears. In the first two years of their existence, the Bears did not perform well. But after several additions to the roster through drafts and the minor league, the Bears turned the team around, eventually winning the 2006 Taiwan Series title.

Lamigo Monkeys (2011–2019)

After several years of futile effort to manage the Kaohsiung market, the team relocated to Taoyuan County (now Taoyuan City) and changed its name to Lamigo Monkeys in January 2011. Lamigo is a subsidiary of La New Corporation that operates a wellness center, restaurants as well as a travel agency in northern Taiwan. Since Lamigo is based in northern Taiwan, the team was moved to Taoyuan County and play their home games at Taoyuan International Baseball Stadium. Their new name in Chinese, taoyuan (桃猿), is a homophone to their new home county. Despite the name change, La New Corporation retained its direct ownership of the team. In 2012, the Monkeys won their first seasonal title after the name change when they defeated Uni-President 7-Eleven Lions four games to one in Taiwan Series. In July 2019, the organization announced that the team would be sold. In September 2019, negotiations with Rakuten to acquire the team closed successfully. With the sale, Rakuten became the first foreign company to own a Chinese Professional Baseball League team. Terms of the sale were not disclosed.

Rakuten Monkeys (2020–present)

The team name was formally changed to the Rakuten Monkeys on 17 December 2019. New uniforms were also revealed, similar in design to the Tohoku Rakuten Golden Eagles uniforms.

In 2020, fans were not allowed to attend sporting events in Taiwan due to the coronavirus pandemic. The Rakuten Monkeys decided to place robotic mannequins in the stands to simulate the appearance of fans at their games.

Records

Regular seasons

Playoffs

Asia Series

Roster

List of managers

Retired numbers
 10 – The number is reserved for the fans, as the tenth player on the field.
 52 – The number is retired in honour of Chin-Feng Chen since September 2016.
 9 – The number is retired in honour of Wang Po-Jung.

See also
Chinese Professional Baseball League

References

External links
Official website 

 
2003 establishments in Taiwan
Baseball teams established in 2003
Rakuten
Chinese Professional Baseball League teams
Sport in Taoyuan City